This is a list of Korean animated tv shows sorted by year. in south korea and North korea(NK); they are in Korean  language only:

List of Korean animated shows in Each decade

1970s
 Squirrel and Hedgehog / 다람이와 고슴도치 (1977) (NK)

1980s
 Boy General / 소년장수 (1982) (NK)
 Clever Raccoon Dog / 다람이와 고슴도치 (1987) (NK)
 Tteodori Kkachi / 떠돌이 까치 (1987)
 Kkachi's Wings / 까치의 날개 (1988)
 Dooly the Little Dinosaur / 아기공룡 둘리 (1987)
 Fairy Land ABC / 동화나라 ABC (1987)
 Hello Kitty / 헬로 키티 (1988)
 Run Hani / 달려라 하니 (1988)
 Naughty Hani / 천방지축 하니 (1989)
 2020 Space Wonder Kiddy / 2020 우주의 원더키디 (1989)
 Wizard Boy Mutterl / 머털도사 (1989)

1990s
 Once Upon a Time / 옛날 옛적에 (1990)
 Yeongsimi / 영심이 (1990)
General of the Earth / 흙꼭두장군 (1991)
 Fly Superboard / 날아라 슈퍼보드 (1991, 1998, 2001)
 Pink the Fairy / 요정 핑크 (1991)
 Penking and Linking / 펭킹 라이킹 (1992)
 Kori, The Son of Wizard / 마법사의 아들 코리 (1993)
 School of Love / 사랑의 학교 (1994)
 Koby Koby / 꼬비꼬비 (1995)
 Dooly's Backpacking / 둘리의 배낭여행 (1995)
 Dodami and Tori Tori / 도담이와 토리토리 (1995)
 Duchi and Puku / 두치와 뿌꾸 (1996)
 Cute Chocomi / 귀여운 쪼꼬미 (1996)
 Soul Frame Lazenca / 영혼기병 라젠카 (1997)
 The Green Chariot Hamos / 녹색전차 해모수 (1997)
 Bio-Cop Wingo / 바이오캅 윙고 (1998)
 LullaRarra /  룰루라라 (1998)
Noodle-Nude / 누들누드 (1998)
 Speed King Bungae / 스피드왕 번개 (1998)
 Black Rubber Shoes / 검정 고무신 (1999, 2001, 2004, 2015)
 Restol, The Special Rescue Squad / 레스톨 특수구조대 (1999)
 Milo's Adventure / 마일로의 대모험 (1999)

2000s
 Clover 4/3 / 클로버 4/3 (2000)
 Pucca web animated series (2000)
 Taekwon King Kang Tae-Pung / 태권왕 강태풍 (2000)
 Track City / 트랙시티 (2000)
 White Heart Beakgu / 하얀마음 백구 (2000)
 Taeng-gu and Ulasyong / 탱구와 울라숑 (2001)
 Unimini Pets / 유니미니펫 (2001)
 BASToF Syndrome / 바스토프 레몬 (2001)
 Ki Fighter Taerang / 기파이터 태랑 (2001)
 Geisters / 가이스터즈 (2001)
 Olympus Guardian / 올림포스 가디언 (2002)
 Super Duper Sumos / 으랏차차 삼총사 (2002)
 The Legend Of Blue / 바다의 전설 장보고 (2002)
 Space Hip-hop Duck / 스페이스 힙합덕 (2002)
 There She Is!! / 떳다 그녀!! (2003)
 Spheres / 스피어즈 (2003)
 Guardian Fairy Michel / 수호요정 미셸 (2003)
 Tank Knights Fortress / 무한 전기 포트 리스 (2003)
 Hey Yo Yorang / 요랑아 요랑아 (2003)
 Woobi Boy / 내 친구 우비소년 (2003)
 Pororo the Little Penguin / 뽀롱뽀롱 뽀로로 (2003)
 Narong, Fly To The Sky / 뚜루뚜루뚜 나롱이 (2004)
 Mix Master / 카드왕 믹스마스터 (2005)
 Maskman / 마스크맨(애니메이션) (2005)
 Jaedong, Let's Go To School / 재동아 학교가자 (2005)
 Jang Geum's Dream / 장금이의 꿈 (2005, 2007)
 Tori Go! Go! / 토리 고! 고! (2006)
 Bug Fighter / 인조곤충 버그파이터 (2006)
 Iron kid / 아이언키드 (2006)
 Kungya Kungya / 쿵야쿵야 (2006)
 Apple Candy Girl / 애플캔디 걸 (2006)
 Pucca / 짜장소녀 뿌까 (2006)
 Revbahaf Kingdom Rebuilding Story / 르브바하프 왕국 재건설기 (2007)
 Doyajibong / 도야지봉 (2007)
 Crazy Park / 다오 배찌 붐힐 대소동 (2007)
 Tai Chi Chasers / 태극천자문 (2007)
 Petit Petit Muse / 쁘띠쁘띠 뮤즈 (2008)
 NEW Dooly the Little Dinosaur / 뉴 아기공룡 둘리 (2008)
 Giga Tribe / 기가 트라이브 (2009)
 Greensaver / 그린세이버 (2009)
 Element Hunters / 엘리먼트 헌터 (2009)
 Rolling Stars / 롤링 스타즈 (2009)
 YooHoo & Friends / 유후와 친구들 (2009)

2010s
 My Friend Haechi / 내 친구 해치 (2010)
 Mix Master: Final Force / 최강 합체 믹스마스터 (2010)
 Bubblegum Cook / 보글보글쿡 (2010)
 MetaJets / 메타제트 (2010)
 Cloud Bread / 구름빵 (2010)
 The Story of Miho / 미호이야기 (2011)
 Ghost Messenger / 고스트 메신저 (2011)
 Art Odyssey / 아트 오디세이 (2011)
 Eori / 어리이야기 (2011)
 Cheap Cheonllima Mart / 쌉니다 천리마마트 (2011)
 Hello Jadoo / 안녕 자두야 (2011)
 Zoobles! / 쥬블스 (2011)
 Welcome to Convenience Store / 와라 편의점 (2012)
 Paboo & Mojies / 빠뿌야 놀자 (2012)
 NEW Wizard Boy Mutterl / 신 머털도사 (2012)
 Mask Master / 마스쿨랜드 (2013)
 School Land / 스쿨랜드 (2013)
 Don't Let Go of the Mental Rope / 놓지마 정신줄 (2014)
 Towards Astar Chagu Chagu / 아스타를 향해 차구차구 (2014)
 Hello Carbot / 헬로 카봇 (2014)
 Miniforce / 미니특공대 (2014)
 Turning Mecard / 터닝메카드 (2015)
 The Sound of Heart / 마음의 소리 (2018) (Naver)
 DinoCore / 다이노코어 (2016)
 Flowering Heart / 플라워링 하트 (2016)
 Elsword: El Lady / 엘소드: 엘의 여인 (2016)
 Closers: SIDE BLACKLAMBS / 클로저스 (2016)
 The Haunted House / 신비아파트 (2016) (CJ ENM, Tooniverse)
 senior class / 졸업반 (2016)
 Capsule Boy - Protect the Universe / 캡슐보이 - 우주를 지켜라 (2016)
 Shining Star / 샤이닝스타 (2017)
 Banzi's Secret Diary / 반지의 비밀일기 (2017)
 Dinosaur Mecard / 공룡메카드 (2017)
 Running Man / 런닝맨 (2017, 2019)
 AEROVER / 에어로버 (2018)
 Pasha Mecard / 빠샤메카드 (2018)
 Mashimaro / 마시마로 (2018)
 Semi in the Magic Cube / 세미와 매직큐브 (2018)
 Bagel Girl / 어느 날 잠에서 깨어보니 베이글녀가 되어 있었다 (2019) (Laftel)

2020s
 Hero Circle / 히어로 써클 (2020)
 Super Secret / 슈퍼 시크릿 (2020) (Laftel, Studio Shelter)
 Maca & Roni / 마카앤로니 (2021)
 Dalja The Vampire Girl / 뱀파이어소녀 달자 (2021)
 After School Treasure Hunt (Pilot) / 방과후 트레저헌팅 (2021)
 Gobllin Hill / 도깨비언덕에 왜 왔니?(2021)
 Semantic Error Special / 시맨틱 에러 스페셜 (2021) (Laftel)
 My Daughter is a Zombie / 좀비딸 (2022)
 Toemarok / 퇴마록 (2022)
 Codename X / 코드네임 X (2022)
Lookism / 외모지상주의 (2022) (Netflix, Studio Mir)
 Space Shaman Hunters / 스페이스 샤먼 헌터 (2022)
 Cubistar / 큐비스타 (202?)
 Creature Hunters / 크리쳐 헌터스 (2023)
 Battle Marvelians (Series) / 배틀 마블리언즈 (2023-2024)

References 

Animated
Animated
Korean